Albert Murdoch McDonald (27 February 1881 – 8 June 1961) was an Australian rules footballer who played with Fitzroy in the Victorian Football League (VFL).

Notes

External links 
			
 

1881 births
1961 deaths
Fitzroy Football Club players
Australian rules footballers from Victoria (Australia)